Salado is an Incorporated community and census-designated place (CDP) in Independence County, Arkansas, United States. It was first listed as a CDP in the 2020 census with a population of 472.

The Goff Petroglyph Site is located here.

The spur route of Arkansas Highway 14 connects Salado with Southside.

Demographics

2020 census

Note: the US Census treats Hispanic/Latino as an ethnic category. This table excludes Latinos from the racial categories and assigns them to a separate category. Hispanics/Latinos can be of any race.

References

External links
Encyclopedia of Arkansas History & Culture entry

Unincorporated communities in Arkansas
Unincorporated communities in Independence County, Arkansas
Census-designated places in Independence County, Arkansas